In enzymology, a galactosylgalactosylxylosylprotein 3-beta-glucuronosyltransferase is an enzyme that catalyzes the chemical reaction

UDP-glucuronate + 3-beta-D-galactosyl-4-beta-D-galactosyl-O-beta-D-xylosylprotein  UDP + 3-beta-D-glucuronosyl-3-beta-D-galactosyl-4-beta-D-galactosyl-O- beta-D-xylosylprotein

Thus, the two substrates of this enzyme are UDP-glucuronate and 3-beta-D-galactosyl-4-beta-D-galactosyl-O-beta-D-xylosylprotein, whereas its 3 products are UDP, 3-beta-D-glucuronosyl-3-beta-D-galactosyl-4-beta-D-galactosyl-O-, and beta-D-xylosylprotein.

This enzyme belongs to the family of glycosyltransferases, specifically the hexosyltransferases.  The systematic name of this enzyme class is UDP-glucuronate:3-beta-D-galactosyl-4-beta-D-galactosyl-O-beta-D-xyl osyl-protein D-glucuronosyltransferase. Other names in common use include glucuronosyltransferase I, and uridine diphosphate glucuronic acid:acceptor glucuronosyltransferase.  This enzyme participates in chondroitin sulfate biosynthesis and glycan structures - biosynthesis 1.  It employs one cofactor, manganese.

Structural studies

References

 
 
 

EC 2.4.1
Manganese enzymes
Enzymes of known structure